The Order of the Nile (Kiladat El Nil) was established in 1915 and was one of the Kingdom of Egypt's principal orders until the monarchy was abolished in 1953. It was then reconstituted as the Republic of Egypt's highest state honor.

Sultanate and Kingdom of Egypt
The Order was established in 1915 by Sultan Hussein Kamel of Egypt for award to persons who had rendered useful service to the country. It ranked beneath the Order of Ismail and was frequently awarded to British officers and officials serving in Egypt, as well as distinguished Egyptian citizens.The order comprised five classes:
 Grand Cordon: Badge worn from a sash over the right shoulder, with a star on the left chest.
 Grand Officer: Badge worn around the neck, with a smaller star on the left chest.
 Commander: Badge worn around the neck.
 Officer: Badge worn on the left chest from a ribbon bearing a rosette.
 Knight: Badge worn on the left chest from a plain ribbon.

Republic of Egypt
After Egypt became a republic in 1953 the Order of the Nile was reconstituted to serve as Egypt's highest state honor. It now consists of:
 Collar: worn by the President of the Republic and may be granted to other Heads of State.
 Grand Cordon: awarded for exceptional services to the nation. Regarding this class, the badge of the order is worn from a sash and the star of the order worn on the left chest.

Although the five class structure of the original 1915 order was mentioned when the order was restructured in 1953, the four more junior grades (i.e. Grand Officer, Commander, Officer and Knight) are no longer awarded.

Some appointees to the order

Sultanate and Kingdom of Egypt (1915–1953) 
 Brigadier Peter Acland (4th class), 1936
 Sir Pratap Singh of Idar  (Grand Cordon), 1918
 Judge Sir Maurice Amos (Grand Cordon)
 Maharaja Jagatjit Singh Bahadur of Kapurthala (Grand Cordon), 1924
 Rear Admiral Richard Bevan (4th Class), 1919
 Field Marshall Lord Birdwood
 Lieutenant General Louis Bols  
 Lieutenant Colonel Arthur Borton VC, DSO (3rd Class)
 Howard Carter, British archaeologist and Egyptologist (3rd Class), 1926
 Jovan Dučić
 Major Aubrey Faulkner
 Major General Harold Franklyn, Commandant Sudan Defence Force, 1939
 Major Harry Gardner (4th Class), 1922
 Lieutenant Colonel Alexander Kearsey (3rd Class)
 Harold Knox-Shaw, British astronomer
 Lancelot Lowther, 6th Earl of Lonsdale, 1920
 Naguib Pasha Mahfouz, obstetrician and gynecologist, 1919
 Lieutenant Colonel Cecil L'Estrange Malone
 Earl Mountbatten of Burma, (fourth class), 1922
 Charles Paget, 6th Marquess of Anglesey, 1915
 General Sir William Peyton (2nd Class), 1916
 General Hussein Refki Pasha (Grand Cordon)
 Admiral Francis Mitchell (Royal Navy officer)
 Rear Admiral Eric Gascoigne Robinson
 Captain George Francis Scott Elliot
 Dr. Hassan Omar Shaheen - Professor of ENT Kasr El-Aini Hospital, Cairo. Circa 1920
 Major-General Sir Charlton Watson Spinks, last Sirdar of Egypt (Grand Cordon), 1931
 Dr. Oskar Stross, Austrian Consul General
 Mervyn Whitfield, Political Branch, Public Security, Alexandria, 1917
 General Sir Reginald Wingate, 1915
 Judge Youssef Zulficar Pasha (Grand Cordon)

Republic of Egypt (from 1953)
 King Hussein of Jordan (1955)
Marshal Josip Broz Tito, President of the Federal People's Republic of Yugoslavia (1956)
 Prof. Amintore Fanfani, Prime Minister and ad-interim Minister of Foreign Affairs of the Republic of Italy (1959)
 President Jimmy Carter, President of the United States (1979)
 Emperor Akihito of Japan
 Emperor Amha Selassie of Ethiopia
 Dr Syedna Mohammed Burhanuddin, Islamic leader (Grand Cordon)
 King Bhumibol Adulyadej of Thailand
 Mohamed ElBaradei, former Director General of the International Atomic Energy Agency (IAEA)
 Queen Elizabeth II, November 1975
 Hassaballah El Kafrawy, Egyptian former Minister of Development, Reconstruction, Housing, New Communities, Public Utilities and Land Reclamation
 King Fahd bin Abdulaziz Al Saud of Saudi Arabia, 1989
 Yuri Gagarin, Soviet cosmonaut
 Pierre  Gemayel, founder of the Lebanese Phalange
 Emperor Haile Selassie of Ethiopia
 King Hamad bin Isa Al Khalifa of Bahrain, 2016
 King Idris of Libya (Grand Cordon)
 Ekmeleddin İhsanoğlu, Turkish academic, diplomat and former Secretary-General of the Organisation of Islamic Cooperation (OIC)
 Émile Lahoud, President of Lebanon, 2000
 Makarios III, former President of Cyprus
 Nelson Mandela, President of South Africa
 Adly Mansour, former Chief Justice of the Supreme Constitutional Court and acting President of Egypt following the 2013 Egyptian coup d'etat
 King Mohammed VI of Morocco
 Muhammad Naguib, First President of Egypt 
 Nursultan Nazarbayev, President of Kazakhstan
 Antonín Novotný, President of Czechoslovakia
 Sultan Qaboos bin Said al Said of Oman, 1976
 Ziaur Rahman, President of Bangladesh
 Heinrich Rau, East German politician (Grand Cordon), 1961
 King Saud bin Abdulaziz Al Saud of Saudi Arabia, 1954
 King Norodom Sihanouk of Cambodia
 William E. Simon, U.S. Secretary of the Treasury
 Suharto, President of Indonesia
 Field Marshal Mohamed Hussein Tantawi, former Chairman of the Supreme Council of the Armed Forces of Egypt, August 2012
 Marshal Josip Broz Tito, President of Yugoslavia, (Grand Cordon with Collar), December 1955
 Walter Ulbricht, President of East Germany, 1965
 George Vasiliou, former President of Cyprus
 Sir Magdi Habib Yacoub, Professor of Cardiothoracic Surgery
 Professor Ahmed Zewail, Egyptian-American scientist
 Katerina Sakellaropoulou, President of Greece, 2020

References

External links
 

Nile, Order of the
Nile, Order of the
Awards established in 1915
1915 establishments in Egypt